Wang Hong may refer to:

 Wang Hong (politician) (王弘) (379–432), courtesy name Xiuyuan (休元), formally Duke Wenzhao of Huarong (華容文昭公), a high-level official of the Chinese dynasty Liu Song
 Wang Hong (archer) (born 1965)
 Wang Hong (cyclist) (born 1997)